Guam competed at the 2004 Summer Olympics in Athens, Greece, from 13 to 29 August 2004.

Athletics 

Guamanian athletes have so far achieved qualifying standards in the following athletics events (up to a maximum of 3 athletes in each event at the 'A' Standard, and 1 at the 'B' Standard). 

Key
 Note–Ranks given for track events are within the athlete's heat only
 Q = Qualified for the next round
 q = Qualified for the next round as a fastest loser or, in field events, by position without achieving the qualifying target
 NR = National record
 N/A = Round not applicable for the event
 Bye = Athlete not required to compete in round

Men

Women

Swimming 

Men

Wrestling 

Key
  - Victory by Fall.
  - Decision by Points - the loser with technical points.
  - Decision by Points - the loser without technical points.

Men's freestyle

References

External links
Official Report of the XXVIII Olympiad
Guam National Olympic Committee

Nations at the 2004 Summer Olympics
2004
Summer Olympics